Highland Park is a residential neighbourhood in the northwest quadrant of Calgary, Alberta. It is bounded to the north by McKnight Boulevard, to the east by Edmonton Trail, to the south by 32 Avenue N and to the west by 4 Street W. Confederation Park and Nose Hill Park are located in close proximity. The Queens Park Cemetery occupies the southwestern corner of the neighbourhood, and the Highland golf course is developed in the north.

The land was annexed to the City of Calgary in 1910 and Highland Park was established in 1946. It is represented in the Calgary City Council by the Ward 4 councillor.

Demographics

Residents in this community had a median household income of $37,766 in 2000, and there were 23.9% low income residents living in the neighbourhood. As of 2000, 13.7% of the residents were immigrants. A proportion of 48.7% of the buildings were condominiums or apartments, and 64% of the housing was used for renting.

Queens Park Village
Queens Park Village is a small community that borders the Queens Park Cemetery, in the southeast corner of Highland Park.

Residents in this community had a median household income of $53,040 in 2000, and there were 20.3% low income residents living in the neighbourhood. Most of the buildings were condominiums or apartments, and 100% of the housing was used for renting.

Education
The community is served by Buchanan Elementary School and James Fowler High public schools.

See also
List of neighbourhoods in Calgary

References

External links
Highland Park Community Association

Neighbourhoods in Calgary